The Daughters of Liberty was the formal female association that was formed in 1765 to protest the Stamp Act, and later the Townshend Acts, and was a general term for women who identified themselves as fighting for liberty during the American Revolution.

Activities
The main task of the Daughters of Liberty was to protest the Stamp Act and Townshend Acts through aiding the Sons of Liberty in boycotts and non-importation movements prior to the outbreak of the Revolutionary War. The Daughters of Liberty participated in spinning bees, helping to produce homespun cloth for colonists to wear instead of British textiles. Women were also used as the enforcers of these movements because they were the ones responsible for purchasing goods for their households. They saw it as their duty to make sure that fellow Patriots were staying true to their word about boycotting British goods.

The Daughters of Liberty are also well known for their boycott of British tea after the Tea Act was passed and the British East India Company was given a virtual monopoly on colonial tea. They began drinking what was later known as "liberty tea." Leaves from raspberries or black tea were commonly used as tea substitutes so people could still enjoy tea while refusing to buy goods imported through Britain.

Chapters of the Daughters of Liberty throughout the colonies participated in the war effort by melting down metal for bullets and helping to sew soldiers’ uniforms. The famed leader of the Sons of Liberty, Samuel Adams, is reported as saying, "With ladies on our side, we can make every Tory tremble."

Women associated with the Daughters of Liberty
 Sarah Bradlee Fulton is most known for her role in the 1773 Boston Tea Party. She is credited with coming up with the idea that Tea Party participants should wear Mohawk disguises to avoid detection from British officials. This suggestion earned her the nickname, "Mother of the Tea Party." She was an active member of the Daughters of Liberty throughout the Revolution, and in later years, she helped to coordinate volunteer nurses to assist with the Battle of Bunker Hill.
 Sarah Franklin Bache was a Daughter of Liberty and the daughter of diplomat Benjamin Franklin. Other than her parentage, she is most known for helping to outfit American Soldiers in 1780.
 Martha Washington, wife of George Washington and First Lady of the United States, joined General Washington during long winter encampments where she was instrumental in providing as much as she could for soldiers.
 Esther de Berdt is best known for creating the Patriot organization, The Ladies of Philadelphia in 1778, which was dedicated to raising money for food and clothing for the Continental Army. Even though she was born in London, she became alienated from Britain by the crown’s actions toward the colonies and decided to fully support the Patriot cause. She is also the author of "Sentiments of an American Woman," an essay that intended to rouse colonial women to join the fight against the British. She was able to use her marriage to Joseph Reed to help her gain more influence and resources.
 Deborah Sampson later emerged as a symbol for female involvement in the Revolutionary War. Rather than supporting the war effort from the outside, she dressed as a man and fought in the war under the name Robert Shurtlieff. She fought in 1781 and her future husband was eventually awarded a pension for her service in the war, albeit after his death.
 Elizabeth Nichols Dyar mixed and applied paint to the men of the Boston Tea Party. She is buried at the Elizabeth Nichols Dyar Memorial in Phillips, Maine, where she lived with her husband Joseph Dyar.

References
 Foner, Eric. Give Me Liberty! An American History W.W. Norton & Company 2010

Notes

 
Patriotic societies
Organizations established in 1765
1765 establishments in the Thirteen Colonies